The Laborcita Formation is a geologic formation in the Sacramento Mountains of New Mexico. It preserves fossils dating back to the late Pennsylvanian to early Permian.

Description
The formation lies on the Holder Formation and is overlain by the Abo Formation.

The formation is interpreted as cyclic sequences of terrestrial and shallow marine carbonate rocks deposited on a narrow shelf lying between the Pedernal Uplift to the east and the Orogrande Basin to the west. Cycles are generally transgressive (recording the advance of the sea), with basal conglomerate giving way to increasingly fine sandstone, siltstone, and shale and finally limestone. Corresponding regressive sequences (recording the retreat of the sea) are very poorly developed.

Fossils
The limestone beds of the formation are highly fossiliferous, containing bioclastic remains from all the main late Paleozoic shallow marine biotic groups. Fusulinids are present that are characteristic of the latest Pennsylvanian and earliest Permian. Microfossils of the formation include the cyanobacteria such as Girvanella,  calcivertellid foraminiferans, and phylloid (leaflike) algae such as Eugonophyllum.

History of investigation
The formation was first named by Otté in 1959 as part of his dissertation at the University of New Mexico.

See also

 List of fossiliferous stratigraphic units in New Mexico
 Paleontology in New Mexico

Footnotes

References
 
 
 
 

Permian formations of New Mexico
Carboniferous southern paleotropical deposits